Auxais is a commune in the Manche department in the Normandy region in northwestern France.

Population
The inhabitants are called Auxerons.

See also
 Communes of the Manche department

References

Communes of Manche